Duane Strydom is a paralympic athlete from South Africa competing mainly in category F36 shot put and discus events.

Duane competed in both shot and discus at the 2004 Summer Paralympics winning a bronze medal in the discus for class F36 athletes.  He attempted to improve on his bronze in 2008 but in the combined F35/36 class could only manage to finish fourth.

References

Paralympic athletes of South Africa
Athletes (track and field) at the 2004 Summer Paralympics
Athletes (track and field) at the 2008 Summer Paralympics
Paralympic bronze medalists for South Africa
Living people
Medalists at the 2004 Summer Paralympics
Year of birth missing (living people)
Place of birth missing (living people)
Paralympic medalists in athletics (track and field)
South African male discus throwers
South African male shot putters
20th-century South African people
21st-century South African people